Bayat may refer to:

Places

Azerbaijan
 Boyat, Aghjabadi
 Boyat, Neftchala
 Boyat, Shamakhi
 Boyat, Ujar

Indonesia
 Bayat, Indonesia, a subdistrict in Klaten Regency, Central Java

Iran
 Bayat, East Azerbaijan
 Bayat-e Sofla, East Azerbaijan Province
 Bayat, Razavi Khorasan
 Bayat, West Azerbaijan
 Bayat Rural District, Markazi Province

Turkey
 Bayat, Afyonkarahisar
 Bayat, Çermik
 Bayat, Çivril
 Bayat, Çorum
 Bayat, Kargı

Other uses
 Bayat (name), a surname in the Middle East and South-Central Asia; includes a list of people with the name
 Bayat (tribe), an Oghuz tribe in Turkmenistan, Iran, Turkey, Azerbaijan, Iraq, and Syria
 Bayat e Kurd, a musical mode in  Iranian and Turkish classical musics
 Bayat e Turk, a musical mode in  Iranian and Turkish classical musics

See also 
 Bayads, a Mongolian ethnic group
 Bay'ah, allegiance to a Muslim leader
 Bay'at al-Imam, an Islamic organisation in Jordan
 Bayati, a form of Azerbaijani folk poetry
 Bayati (maqam), a musical mode in Arabic, Turkish, and related systems of music